The 1953 Wisconsin Badgers football team represented the University of Wisconsin in the 1953 Big Ten Conference football season.

Schedule

Team players in the 1954 NFL Draft

References

Wisconsin
Wisconsin Badgers football seasons
Wisconsin Badgers football